
Gmina Wadowice is an urban-rural gmina (administrative district) in Wadowice County, Lesser Poland Voivodeship, in southern Poland.

Villages
Apart from the town of Wadowice, Gmina Wadowice contains the villages and settlements of Babica, Barwałd Dolny, Chocznia, Gorzeń Dolny, Gorzeń Górny, Jaroszowice, Kaczyna, Klecza Dolna, Klecza Górna, Ponikiew, Ponikiew-Chobot, Roków, Stanisław Górny, Wysoka and Zawadka.

Neighbouring gminas
Gmina Wadowice is bordered by the gminas of Kalwaria Zebrzydowska, Mucharz, Stryszów, Tomice, Wieprz and Zembrzyce.

References
Polish official population figures 2006

Wadowice
Wadowice County